Jean-Michel Regnier is a French slalom canoeist who competed from the late 1980s to the late 1990s. He won two medals in the K-1 team event at the ICF Canoe Slalom World Championships with a gold in 1991 and a silver in 1997.

References

French male canoeists
Living people
Year of birth missing (living people)
Medalists at the ICF Canoe Slalom World Championships